"Switchboard Susan" is a song written by Mickey Jupp and recorded by Nick Lowe for his 1979 album, Labour of Lust.  The song was released as a single in North America only, and reached #81  Canada and #107 on the US pop chart.

The song was produced by Lowe.

Cover versions
Gary Brooker released a version of the song on his 1979 album, No More Fear of Flying.
The Searchers released a version of the song on their 1979 album, The Searchers.
Per Gessle and Niklas Strömstedt re-wrote the lyrics in Swedish and in 1980 the song was recorded by Rockfile. It was given the title "Marie i växeln", referring to an EMI employee.
Jupp released his own version of the song as the B-side to his 1980 single, "Rooms in Your Roof".
Rockpile released a version of the song on their 1980 live album, Live at Montreux 1980.
The Hamsters released a version of the song on their 2004 album, Open All Hours.

References

1979 songs
1979 singles
Songs written by Mickey Jupp
Nick Lowe songs
The Searchers (band) songs
Gyllene Tider songs
Song recordings produced by Nick Lowe